This is a list of Bulgarian football transfers in the winter transfer window 2010 by club. Only transfers of the A PFG clubs are listed.

Litex

In:

Out:

CSKA Sofia

In:

Out:

Chernomorets

In:

Out:

Lokomotiv Sofia

In:

Out:

Levski Sofia

In:

Out:

Minyor

In:

Out:

Slavia

In:

Out:

Beroe

In:

Out:

Pirin

In:

Out:

Cherno More

In:

Out:

Montana

In:

Out:

Lokomotiv Mezdra

In:

 

Out:

Sportist

In:
 

Out:

Sliven

In:

Out:

Lokomotiv Plovdiv

In:

Out:

Botev Plovdiv

In:

Out:

References

Bulgaria
Winter 2009–10